Nikël is a village and a former municipality in the Durrës County, western Albania. At the 2015 local government reform it became a subdivision of the municipality Krujë. The population at the 2011 census was 9,518.

References

Administrative units of Krujë
Former municipalities in Durrës County
Villages in Durrës County
Populated places disestablished in 2015